Nephalius is a genus of beetles in the family Cerambycidae, containing the following species:

 Nephalius cassus Newman, 1841
 Nephalius spiniger (Blanchard in Orbigny, 1847)

References

Elaphidiini